Sardinera is a barrio in the municipality of Fajardo, Puerto Rico. Its population in 2010 was 1,190.

History
Puerto Rico was ceded by Spain in the aftermath of the Spanish–American War under the terms of the Treaty of Paris of 1898 and became an unincorporated territory of the United States. In 1899, the United States Department of War conducted a census of Puerto Rico finding that the combined population of Naranjo and Sardinera barrios was 999.

A shipment of cocaine with an estimated value of over US$6 million was confiscated in early 2021 at the marina in Sardinera.

This initiative was launched by Mayor José Aníbal “Joey” Meléndez Méndez to tackle hunger.

See also

 List of communities in Puerto Rico

References

Barrios of Fajardo, Puerto Rico